The 1949 Troy State Red Wave football team represented Troy State Teachers College (now known as Troy University) as a member of the Alabama Intercollegiate Conference (AIC) during the 1949 college football season.

Schedule

References

Troy State
Troy Trojans football seasons
Troy State Red Wave football